Noak Bridge is a housing estate in the civil parish of Laindon in Basildon, Essex.

The estate takes its name from the bridge over the River Crouch at the foot of nearby Noak Hill. Prior to its development most of the area was secondary woodland that had developed on the site of previous plotlands known as 'Central Park'. The continued use of South African street names in part of the area reflects the street names in the previous development.
When people first moved into Noak Bridge the area was often popularly referred to as 'Wash Road', or the 'Wash Road Estate' after the road on its northern boundary, which in turn took its name from the 'wash' or ford that has now been replaced by a bridge just before the road's junction with Harding Elms Road.

Part of that secondary woodland survives as Noak Bridge Nature Reserve.

Noak Bridge is a rare example of a post-war, social housing estate that has been designated a Conservation Area . First planned in the 1970s as part of Basildon new town, Noak Bridge was separated from the rest of the town and it was decided that it should have the traditional character of an English village.  The project architects were Maurice Naunton and George Garrard. Construction began in 1979 and within 3 years almost 400 rented dwellings had been built, including bungalows and sheltered housing, as well as a school, surgery, and shops. In terms of urban design, it as an early example of successful "place-making".

School
The area's only primary school is Noak Bridge School (full name Noak Bridge County Primary School). The school has approximately 250 pupils, from the pre-school on to year 6. The school opened in September 1982, but for the first half-term operated from the former Nevendon School site (now the ITEC centre) on the Burnt Mills Industrial Estate.

Parish council
Noak Bridge has a parish council and collects a tax to meet local needs.

Village Hall
The Noak Bridge Village Hall serves as a Councillor's surgery.

Medical Centre
Noak Bridge Medical Centre serves those within the Noak Bridge, Noak Mead & Noak Park, Steeple View and Crays Hill areas.

Shops
The area's two shops are a Pharmacy and a Post Office/Costcutter.

Nature Reserve
The Noak Bridge Nature Reserve lies to the south east of the settlement and consists of twenty acres of meadow, scrub and woodland. It contains several ponds which attract a variety of amphibians and dragonflies.

The Reserve is the remains of the secondary woodland that covered much of the site before the estate was developed. This secondary woodland was notable for containing numerous garden species as well as pioneer woodland species such as hawthorn and oak.

See also
 Basildon

References

External links
 Map of the area

Borough of Basildon